Somewhere in the Stars is the fourth studio album by American singer Rosanne Cash, released on June 16, 1982 by Columbia Records; her third album for the label. It produced three Billboard hits in the country top 20, including the #4 "Ain't No Money", the #8 "I Wonder", and the #14 "It Hasn't Happened Yet". The album itself rose as high as #6 on the country albums chart. Cash's father Johnny Cash sang background vocals on the track "That's How I Got to Memphis".

Track listing

Personnel
Rosanne Cash - Vocals, Guitar
Vince Gill - Rhythm Guitar, Vocals
Albert Lee - Guitar
Larrie Londin - Drums
Bill Payne - Organ
Ricky Skaggs - Vocals
Reggie Young - Electric Guitar
Russell Smith - Vocals
Tony Brown - Electric Piano
Richard Bennett - Electric Guitar
Rosemary Butler - Vocals
Hank DeVito - Steel Guitar
Emory Gordy Jr. - Guitar, Bass, Piano
Marty Grebb - Saxophone
Sherilyn Huffman - Vocals
Shane Keister - Synthesizer
Maxayn Lewis - Vocals
Mike Porter - Percussion
Sharon White-Skaggs - Vocals
Johnny Cash - Vocals on "That's How I Got To Memphis"
Technical
Bradley Hartman - engineer
Beverly Parker - photography

Charts

Weekly charts

Year-end charts

References

1982 albums
Rosanne Cash albums
Albums produced by Rodney Crowell
Columbia Records albums